Newport is a municipality of about 700 people in Le Haut-Saint-François Regional County Municipality, in Quebec, Canada. Newport has a small town called Island Brook.

On July 24, 2002, the then-township of Newport was amalgamated into the city of Cookshire-Eaton as part of the early 2000s municipal reorganization in Quebec.  After a referendum, Newport de-merged and became an independent municipality on January 1, 2006.  However, it remains part of the urban agglomeration of Cookshire-Eaton.

References

External links

Municipalities in Quebec
Incorporated places in Estrie
Le Haut-Saint-François Regional County Municipality